The Fuji Finepix M603 is an upright point and shoot camera capable of capturing images of resolutions up to 6.03MP. The camera also includes a 320x240 pixel VGA video capture mode and is fitted with a 2.5in LCD, yet completely lacks a viewfinder.

References
 http://www.photographyblog.com/reviews_fuji_finepix_m603.php

M603